Gene-X is an independent Australian feature film, released in the latter half of 2006. It is directed and written by Martin Simpson and stars Ayşe Tezel, Patrick Magee and Peter Astridge.

Plot summary
A young research doctor named Tom Gray is on the verge of a genetic cure for cancer. Nurse Casey Gordon is desperate to save the life of a child in her care and seduces Tom into testing his therapy. Early success brings romance into Tom's life for the first time, but Casey has a secret lover whose jealous anger puts their lives in danger, and Tom finds his cure has a dark side.

Cast

Production
Principal photography was in Sydney between 31 May 2005 and 8 July 2005. Picture lock-off was reached in early February 2006 and post production was completed in September 2006.

Premier
Gene-X premiered at the London-Australian Film Festival in 2007.

References

External links

Australian thriller films
2006 films
2006 thriller films
2000s English-language films
2000s Australian films